Sachal Vasandani, known professionally as Sachal, is an American jazz singer. Vasandani released Slow Motion Miracles on the Okeh label in 2015. He previously released three albums on Mack Avenue Records, Eyes Wide Open in 2007, We Move in 2009, and Hi-Fly in 2011. He is known for his unique interpretations of jazz standards and instrumental music, and is also a songwriter, composer and improvisor.

A native of Chicago, Vasandani attracted attention in 1999 when he was named Down Beat magazine's Collegiate Jazz Vocalist of the Year. He has worked with Wynton Marsalis and the Lincoln Center Jazz Orchestra. His debut album was Eyes Wide Open. He has performed consistently worldwide since his first release on Mack Avenue Records in 2007. His second album, We Move (2009), was a New York Times Critics' Pick. He has collaborated with many of the prominent jazz artists of his generation and those of earlier generations, including: Jon Hendricks, Wynton Marsalis, Bill Charlap, Bobby McFerrin, John Clayton, Stefon Harris,  Gerald Clayton, Taylor Eigsti, Gretchen Parlato, Becca Stevens, Camila Meza, and others.

He is a graduate of the University of Michigan, where he studied jazz and classical music.

Reception
2015's "Slow Motion Miracles" was described as "Profoundly beautiful.. wide-eyed wonder that subtly threads its sway through much of the album" in a 4-star review by Jazzwise magazine.

In 2010, Vasandani received the Downbeat Magazine Critic's Poll for "Rising Star Jazz Vocalist"

In a September 20, 2009, review in The New York Times, Nate Chinen called Vasandani "a jazz singer with good ideas, including some about what a jazz singer can be."

In a review of Eyes Wide Open, The Boston Globe suggested that Vasandani is "mature in sound and rich in texture but also possesses enough youthful angst in its lyrical themes to ward off the fogeyism that male vocalists so easily slip into before their time."

In an NPR interview that aired in 2011, anchor Michele Norris said, "Every now and again you hear a special voice that makes you sit up and take notice. Sachal Vasandani has that voice".

Slow Motion Miracles (2015) features original compositions, incorporating "an almost undefinable fusion of the best of pop, electronic, and jazz." The album was produced by Michael Leonhart.

Discography

Albums

Singles 
 Use somebody, with Gerald Clayton and Harish Raghavan (GSI, 2020).

Compilations 
 It's Christmas on Mack Avenue (Mack Avenue, 2014)

References

External links
 
 Review from Albany Times Union

American jazz singers
Singers from Chicago
University of Michigan School of Music, Theatre & Dance alumni
American male musicians of Indian descent
American people of Indian descent
American people of Sindhi descent
American Hindus
1978 births
Living people
Jazz musicians from Illinois
Okeh Records artists
Mack Avenue Records artists